The Santa Rosa Science and Technology High School is a non-sectarian, co-educational secondary public science and technology high school located in J.P Rizal Blvd. Barangay Market Area, Santa Rosa City, Laguna, 4026, in the Philippines.

History 
President Gloria Macapagal-Arroyo signed into law the Republic Act 9083, creating the Santa Rosa Science and Technology High School on April 8, 2001. Cong. Uliran T. Joaquin of the First District of Laguna was its principal author.

The law was implemented in the school year 2002-2003 through the initiative and financial support of the local government of Santa Rosa led by Mayor Leon C. Arcillas.

Admissions

Application Policies for Junior High School

 Applicant student must belong to the upper 20% of the graduating class, and has grades at least 85% in subjects such as Mathematics, Science, and English as of 2nd quarter Grade VI, certified by the Principal.
 Average score in Santa Rosa Science and Technology High School Entrance Examinations or STENEX for Junior High is at least 85% or above in three phases of assessment, namely:

 Proficiency Examination in Mathematics, Science and English 
 Mental ability/aptitude Examination 
 Interview

Curriculum

 Santa Rosa Science and Technology High School founded Science, Technology and Engineering (STE) Curriculum with STEM (Science, Technology, Engineering and Mathematics) Program. It is focused on pure science and its applications to industry using the latest technologies. Computer rooms are to be linked to the internet, including multi-media classrooms. Instruction shall be supplemented with visits to known science institutions, laboratories & plants. The school shall maintain a well-stock library, and to subscribe to professional, scientific and technological magazines and manuals.

Grade 7 
 Filipino 7: Ibong Adarna
 English 7: Philippine Literature
 Science 7
Biology 7
Physics 7
Chemistry 7
Earth and Space 7
 Mathematics 7
 Araling Panlipunan: Kasaysayan ng Asya
 MAPEH 7
 Edukasyon sa Pagpapakatao

Specialized Subjects

 Computer 7
Introduction to Word Processors: MS Word
Introduction to Spreadsheet Programs: MS Excel
Introduction to Presentation Programs: MS PowerPoint
 Mathematics Investigatory 7
 Research 7

Grade 8 
 Filipino 8: Florante at Laura
 English 8: Asian and African Literature
 Science 8
Physics 8
Earth Science 8
Chemistry 8
Biology 8
 Mathematics 8
 Araling Panlipunan 8: Kasaysayang Pandaigdig
 MAPEH 8
 Edukasyon sa Pagpapakatao 8

Specialized Subjects

 Computer 8
Basics of Computer Hardware Servicing
Introduction to Image Manipulation: Adobe Photoshop 
Introduction to Desktop Publishing: MS Publisher
Introduction to Web Design/HTML: Notepad+
 Research 8
Applied Research
Life Research
 Math Investigatory 8

Grade 9 
 Filipino 9: Noli me Tangere
 English 9: Anglo-American Literature
 Science 9
Biology 9
Chemistry 9
Physics 9
Earth and Space 9 
 Enhanced Mathematics 9
 Araling Panlipunan 9: Economics 
 MAPEH 9
 Edukasyon Sa Pagpapakatao 9

Specialized Subjects

 Research 9
Applied Research
Life Research
 Electronics
 Computer 9
 Biotechnology 9

Grade 10 
 Filipino 10: El Filibusterismo
 English 10: World Literature
 Science 10
Earth Science 10
Physics 10
Biology 10
Chemistry 10
 Organic Chemistry
 Mathematics 10
 Araling Panilipunan 10: Kontemporaryong Isyu
 MAPEH 10
 Edukasyon sa Pagpapakatao 10

Specialized Subjects 

 Electronics and Robotics
 Research 10
Applied Research
Life Research

Grade Maintenance and Promotion Policies

Standard Grades

Junior High
No failing grade in any subject for the school year.
85% or above grade in Mathematics, Science, English, and Research.
83% or above grade in other subjects.

Senior High
No failing grade in any subject in any semester.

NOTE:  Proper behavioral decorum and attitude is also a must.

References

Schools in Santa Rosa, Laguna
High schools in Laguna (province)
Science high schools in the Philippines